Steve D'Acquisto (1953–2001) was an American disco DJ and record producer.

He started the concept of the record pool with David Mancuso, Paul Casella and Vince Aletti in 1975 in New York City.

D'Acquisto also collaborated with Arthur Russell in the disco group Loose Joints.

References

1953 births
2001 deaths
20th-century American musicians
American DJs